Vadim Anatolyevich Yankov (born 1 February 1935) is a Russian mathematician, philosopher and former political prisoner.

In 1968, Yankov co-signed a letter of 99 Soviet mathematicians asking for the release of imprisoned mathematician Alexander Esenin-Volpin.

Shortly before the 1981 martial law crisis in Poland, Yankov sent out a seven-page samizdat letter "A Letter to Russian Workers
about the-Events in Poland". In it, he encouraged the Soviet working class to follow the example of Solidarity, stressing social participation and non-violent protest.

In 1982, he was arrested and charged with anti-Soviet agitation and propaganda. He was sentenced in January 1983 to four years of imprisonment and three years in internal exile. He served his time in Dubravlag labor camp in Mordovia, near Moscow, and his exile in Buryatia in south-central Siberia. He was released in January 1987 and rehabilitated in 1991. Yankov is featured as a prominent character in Levan Berdzenishvili's novel Sacred Darkness, describing their joint time in prison. 

After 1991, he taught mathematics and philosophy at the Department of Intellectual Systems at Russian State University for the Humanities in Moscow.

References

External links
 Entry at MathNet.ru
 

1935 births
Living people
20th-century Russian mathematicians
21st-century Russian mathematicians
Soviet mathematicians
Soviet dissidents
Prisoners and detainees of the Soviet Union
Academic staff of the Russian State University for the Humanities